Miss America 1980, the 53rd Miss America pageant, was televised from the Boardwalk Hall in Atlantic City, New Jersey on September 8, 1979 by the NBC Television Network.

Results

Placements

Order of announcements

Top 10

Awards

Preliminary awards

Non-finalist awards

Judges
Irene Dailey
Janet Langhart
Gavin MacLeod
Ray Sax Schroeder
Roger Simon
Jerry Vale
Dr. Glenn Whitesides
Nadine Gae Schroeder

Contestants

External links
 Miss America official website

1980
1979 in the United States
1980 beauty pageants
1979 in New Jersey
September 1979 events in the United States
Events in Atlantic City, New Jersey